The Conqueror is a novel written by Georgette Heyer. It is based on the life of William the Conqueror.

Plot summary
It chronicles the life of William of Normandy (the Conqueror) from his birth in 1028 to his conquest of England in 1066. Born the illegitimate son of Robert, future Duke of Normandy, William has to fight to prove himself in the eyes of his people and the eyes of his enemies. Succeeding to the title at age seven, William relies heavily on the support of his great-uncle, Archbishop Robert. With the death of Archbishop Robert only a year after William becomes Duke of Normandy, the duchy descends into chaos and anarchy, with many parties contending for control over the young duke. At first, Alan of Brittany takes custody of the duke, and when Alan dies he is replaced by Gilbert of Brionne. Gilbert is killed within months, and another guardian, Turchetil, is also killed around the time of Gilbert's death. Yet another guardian, Osbern, is slain in William's chamber while the duke sleeps. Walter, William's uncle, is forced to hide the young duke in the houses of peasants. After the fight is won William then has to prove himself to Lady Matilda, daughter of Count Baldwin of Flanders, to win her love.

1931 British novels
Novels by Georgette Heyer
Historical romance novels
Novels set in the Middle Ages
Cultural depictions of William the Conqueror
Heinemann (publisher) books
Novels set in the 11th century